Gnocchi alla romana are a typical dish of Roman cuisine.

They are prepared with gnocchi made of semolina, whole milk, butter and parmesan cheese, seasoned with a sauce and pepper. They are baked in the oven after being sprinkled with parmesan cheese, and are traditionally topped with meatballs, tomato sauce and parmesan cheese.

Gluten-free gnocchi alla romana are made by replacing semolina with cornmeal.

The dish is also present in the Piedmontese culinary tradition due to the presence of butter, which is a common ingredient in Northern Italy.

See also 
 Gnocchi

References 

Milk dishes
Wheat dishes
Italian cuisine
Cuisine of Lazio